Agasanuru  is a village in the southern state of Karnataka, India. It is located in the Siruguppa taluk of Bellary district in Karnataka.

Located in the border area of North-Karnataka, this village is known for its Moharram festival which is celebrated by both Muslims and Hindus.

See also
 Bellary
 Districts of Karnataka

References

External links
 http://Bellary.nic.in/

Villages in Bellary district